The 2003 Arab Athletics Championships was the thirteenth edition of the international athletics competition between Arab countries which took place in Amman, Jordan from 5–9 September.

Medal summary

Men

Women

Medal table

Overall

Men

Women

References

 Championnats arabes, Amman (Jordanie) 07-09/09. Africa Athle. Retrieved on 2013-11-05.

Arab Athletics Championships
International athletics competitions hosted by Jordan
Sports competitions in Amman
Arab Athletics Championships
Arab Athletics Championships
21st century in Amman